The Albany River Rats were a minor league professional ice hockey team in the American Hockey League. They played in Albany, New York at the Times Union Center.

History

Before the formation of the franchise
Without a viable indoor arena with an ice surface, through the end of the 1980s the city of Albany had never had a minor league professional hockey team.   Three separate attempts to establish teams in the neighboring cities of Schenectady and Troy had proven unsuccessful.

The first was in the 1952-53 season when the Capital Region had its first foray into pro hockey in the form of the Troy Uncle Sam Trojans, who played a single season in the Eastern Hockey League, finishing last in the five-team loop and folding after the season.

Professional hockey would not return to the Capital Region until the 1980s, with a pair of failed attempts to establish franchises in the low-level Atlantic Coast Hockey League.   The Schenectady Chiefs were awarded a charter franchise in the ACHL's inaugural 1981-82 season, but after drawing minuscule crowds in a rink built in a converted department store, that team folded on November 18, 1981 after just nine games.  Roughly five years later, the Troy Slapshots joined the same league and played just 6 games before folding in November 17, 1986.

After this troubled period for hockey in the region, construction of the palatial Knickerbocker Arena in downtown Albany in 1990 changed the face of the sport in the Capital District.  The week that the new arena opened, plans were unveiled worldwide for the formation of the fledgling Global Hockey League, a challenger to the NHL with teams in North America and Europe that would begin play in November of that year. One of six inaugural franchises announced in the league's initial press conference was the Albany Admirals, which was to be owned by businessman Joseph O'Hara and had signed a lease to play in the Knickerbocker Arena.  The Capital hockey community was abuzz with excitement, and commitments for over 3,000 season tickets were received.  However, by the end of May, disagreements between O'Hara and the league founders led O'Hara to withdraw his franchise from the new league.  In June, the league postponed its opening season by a year, but the venture never materialized and the Global Hockey League never made it to the ice.

Since 1979, Capital Region hockey fans, press and media had effectively adopted the Adirondack Red Wings as their pseudo-home team.  Although the American Hockey League team was based 45 minutes north of Albany in Glens Falls, NY, it relied on fans from the Capital Region as a vital part of their market. The situation set the stage for a flurry of activity as other teams and leagues eyed the area.  

It began when area investors tried to secure an expansion American Hockey League franchise for Albany, but the Adirondack Red Wings nixed the effort by invoking their territorial rights to the Tri-Cities area.  Soon after, an attempt to establish an International Hockey League franchise at the "Knick" was vetoed by IHL Governors concerned about the travel costs for teams in the Midwest-based league.  Then attempts to lure the A-Wings to the new arena were thwarted when that franchise signed a new ten-year lease to remain in Glens Falls.

In the summer of 1990, David Welker, the owner of the Fort Wayne Komets of the International Hockey League, having made an arrangement to absorb a portion of other teams' travel costs, announced he was moving his franchise to Knickerbocker Arena, and the Albany Choppers were born.

The Birth of the Capital District Islanders
Officials of the established American Hockey League felt that the Midwest-based IHL was invading their territory, and the hockey war was on.  The AHL hoped to create a situation that might somehow force the IHL team out of the market.  League officials felt that if they added an additional AHL franchise to the market,  they'd create a natural rival for the Adirondack Red Wings. Although the Choppers had the distinct advantage of the new arena, the AHL was hoping to counter that advantage with the established fan base of the AHL, the affiliations of NHL clubs, the higher classification and better quality of play of the AHL, and the new rivalry between the established Wings and the fledgling Islanders.

The AHL knew the market was not big enough to support three professional hockey teams, but they were willing to take the risk.  The AHL convinced the Adirondack Red Wings to waive their territorial rights to the Capital Region, and a new AHL team was granted to neighboring Troy.  Local car dealer Mike Cantanucci formed the Capital District Islanders, who would play in the RPI's Houston Fieldhouse and be affiliated with the NHL's New York Islanders.

Despite playing in the state-of-the-art Knickerbocker Arena, the Choppers became the casualty of the Tri-Cities price and attendance wars.   Welker's management style turned off advertisers, sponsors, and fans alike, and on February 11, 1991 with dwindling attendance, high lease and travel costs, no NHL affiliation to help pay expenses, and not enough money to meet player payroll, the Choppers folded in midseason.

The AHL was the clear winner in the battle for hockey in the Capital Region, and the result was a new AHL franchise that would become the predominant hockey franchise in the metropolitan area for the next two decades.

The team competed in the AHL as the Capital District Islanders for three seasons, playing on campus at RPI located across the Hudson River in Troy, New York.

The Islanders showed slow but modest improvement in their three years in Troy, moving from a seventh-place division finish in their inaugural season to a fourth-place finish and playoff berth in season two, to a 34-34-12 record in 1992-93, good for third in the division and another first-round playoff exit.

Transition from the Islanders to the River Rats

Significant changes were made for the 1993-94 season.  Cantanucci sold the franchise to local insurance executive Al Lawrence, and the team switched affiliations from the Islanders to the New Jersey Devils. With the Knickerbocker Arena untapped as a hockey facility, the franchise moved from the campus of RPI to the 15,000-seat downtown arena, and changed their nickname to the Albany River Rats.

The Rats' glory days came in the mid- to late-1990s making seven consecutive playoff appearances, winning two division titles, and taking home the AHL's Calder Cup in 1995. Also in 1995, their parent club, the New Jersey Devils, won the Stanley Cup.

However, wins declined after the 1997–98 season, the last time Albany won a playoff series. By 1998, owner Al Lawrence had been mired in bankruptcy court and was forced to sell the River Rats hockey team.  Walter Robb purchased the franchise, allowing the franchise to remain in Albany.

The River Rats finished last in each of the six seasons between 2000–01 and 2005–06. A new affiliation with the Carolina Hurricanes beginning in the 2006–07 season brought hope of a return to AHL glory not seen in Albany since the late 1990s.

On March 22, 2006, the Devils announced that they were cutting ties with the River Rats after the 2005–06 AHL season, as the parent club announced the purchase of the Lowell Lock Monsters. Despite the move, the River Rats were not relocated. In April 2006, The Carolina Hurricanes signed a one-year agreement (with the option to renew for two additional) with the River Rats to be their farm affiliate; the end result was essentially a swap of AHL affiliates as the Lowell franchise had previously been the top affiliate of Carolina. Later on, Carolina was joined by the Colorado Avalanche in a one-year partnership agreement. On February 22, 2007, the Carolina Hurricanes and Albany River Rats announced that their affiliation agreement had been extended through the 2008–09 season.

On April 24, 2008, the River Rats lost 3–2 to the Philadelphia Phantoms in the (until then) longest game played in AHL history. The Phantoms' Ryan Potulny scored 2:58 into the fifth overtime. Albany gave up 101 shots on goal, and goaltender Michael Leighton made 98 saves.

2009 bus crash
On February 19, 2009, five people were seriously injured when a bus carrying the team home from a game in Lowell struck a guard rail and rolled on its side on Interstate 90 in Becket, Massachusetts. Nicolas Blanchard, Joe Jensen, Jonathan Paiement, Casey Borer, and the River Rats radio color commentator John Hennessy were taken to Berkshire Medical Center in Pittsfield with serious injuries.

Move to Charlotte
In late January, 2010, word began to leak out of Raleigh that the franchise was about to be sold and moved to Charlotte, North Carolina.  On February 10, it became official as the Albany River Rats website announced that the sale of the franchise had been completed, and that the team  would be moving to Charlotte at the conclusion of the 2009–10 AHL Season. "Capital District Sports, Inc. announced today that its subsidiary, the Albany River Rats, has sold its American Hockey League franchise to MAK Hockey, LLC located in Charlotte, North Carolina.  The sale will not affect the remainder of the 2009-10 season, with regular season games concluding on April 10, 2010 followed by the 2010 Calder Cup Playoffs."

The relocated team, to be known as the Charlotte Checkers, would remain the top affiliate of the Carolina Hurricanes and replace that city's ECHL franchise of the same name.

Hockey in Albany after the River Rats
Shortly after the announcement of the sale of the franchise, officials in Albany, as well as AHL President Dave Andrews, told media outlets that the city would likely have a team for the 2010-2011 season and might even keep the River Rats nickname and logo, which remained the property of former owner Walter Robb.  On March 15, it was reported in the Albany Times Union and the Portland Press Herald that Albany officials had their sights set on the AHL's Portland Pirates as a potential candidate for relocation, but talks between the Times Union Center and Pirates ownership eventually broke off.

Although relocation of the Portland franchise would not come to fruition, Albany did not go long without an AHL franchise.  On June 6, it was announced that the Lowell Devils would be relocating to Albany, reestablishing the city's connection with the New Jersey Devils. Despite the tradition of the River Rats branding, officials announced that as a separate entity from the previous franchise, the new team would be known as the Albany Devils. The relationship only lasted through the 2016–17 season, after which the Devils announced they would be relocating their AHL team to Binghamton, New York to replace the Ottawa Senators' team after they relocated.

Affiliates
New Jersey Devils (1993–2006)
Colorado Avalanche (2006–2007)
Carolina Hurricanes (2006–2010)

This market was previously served by: Albany Choppers of the IHL (1990–91)
The franchise was replaced by: Albany Devils of the AHL, a relocation of the Lowell Devils (2010–2017)
The franchise was later known as: Charlotte Checkers

Season-by-season results

Regular season

Playoffs

Team records

Single season
Goals: 46  Jeff Williams (1998–99)
Assists: 63  Keith Aucoin (2006–07)
Points: 99  Keith Aucoin (2006–07)
Penalty Minutes: 348  Matt Ruchty (1994–95)
GAA: 2.10  Michael Leighton (2007–08)
SV%: .931  Michael Leighton (2007–08)

Career
Career goals: 155  Steve Brûlé
Career assists: 214  Steve Brûlé
Career points: 369  Steve Brûlé
Career penalty minutes: 1197  Rob Skrlac
Career goaltending wins: 77  Peter Sidorkiewicz
Career shutouts: 8  Peter Sidorkiewicz
Career games: 423  Jiri Bicek

References

External links
The Internet Hockey Database - Albany River Rats

 
Carolina Hurricanes minor league affiliates
Colorado Avalanche minor league affiliates
New Jersey Devils minor league affiliates
Sports in Albany, New York
Ice hockey teams in New York (state)
Ice hockey clubs established in 1993
Sports clubs disestablished in 2010
1993 establishments in New York (state)
2010 disestablishments in New York (state)